Tirupati is a major pilgrimage city in Tirupati district of Andhra Pradesh, India.

 Tirupati may also refer to:

Andhra Pradesh, India
 Tirupati district, a district in the state of Andhra Pradesh
 Tirupati Temple, in Tirupati
 Tirupati Municipal Corporation, the civic body that governs the city of Tirupati
 Tirupati Urban Development Authority, the planning authority for Tirupati district 
 Tirupati revenue division, in Tirupati district
 Tirupati (Assembly constituency)
 Tirupati (Lok Sabha constituency)
 Tirupati (urban) mandal, in Tirupati district 
 Tirupati (rural) mandal, in Tirupati district
 Tirupati (NMA), a census town in Tirupati district
 Tirupati Airport
 Tirumala Tirupati Devasthanams, the trust which manages Tirupati Temple

People with the surname
 Shashaa Tirupati (born 1989), Canadian playback singer, songwriter, and music producer

Other uses 
 Thirupathi (2006 Tamil film), a Tamil language film written and directed by Perarasu
 Tirupathi (2006 Kannada film), a Kannada film directed by Shivamani